The Charlie Parker Story is an LP record by Charlie Parker, released posthumously by Savoy Records. While many of the tracks on this album had been previously released on other formats (78 rpm records, 7-inch EPs and singles, and 10- and 12-inch LPs), this is the first album that chronicles the entire session, recorded November 26, 1945, including all takes of all pieces. This session is famous in that it is the first recorded under Parker's name. It is also controversial, in that to this day it is unclear who the pianist and trumpet player are on all of the tracks.

Background

According to the booklet accompanying Charlie Parker: The Complete Savoy Sessions (which consults "documents from the Savoy files and the recollections of Teddy Reig, who produced this session") this was to be "a standard three hours/four side session [that] was scheduled for November 26, 1945, at the WOR studios in New York for which Parker would supply original compositions. A Union contract was arranged the preceding week and Parker; Miles Davis, trumpet; Bud Powell, piano; Curly Russell, bass; and Max Roach, drums were booked for the date. On the 26th Reig went to Parker's apartment to bring Bird to WOR and was informed that Powell had gone with his mother to Philadelphia where she was buying a house. No need to worry, however; Dizzy Gillespie was present and introduced to Reig: 'Here's your piano player'. Parker also had contacted Argonne Thornton (later a.k.a. Sadik Hakim), ... and asked that he appear at the studio."

The author of the liner notes of this album—John Mehegan—is under the impression that Powell was present, adding to the controversy over piano players. That Powell was absent is agreed by other sources, including the personnel listings of all other issues of these recordings, which list Gillespie and\or and Hakim on various tracks, sometimes contradicting each other. On the earliest releases of tracks from the session—on 78 rpm records—the pianist is listed as "Hen Gates", a pseudonym known to be used by Dizzy Gillespie. He was listed thus due to his being under contract to the Musicraft label at the time of the recording. The second 78 rpm release of "Thriving on a Riff" (Savoy 945), though, credits Gillespie on piano; later reissues credit Hakim on this track.

Mehegan mentions Hakim in his notes, stating: "As a final irony, a pianist by the name of Argonne Thornton claims he played the date or at least part of it, although this is denied by Herman Lubinsky, who conducted the session." This denial, though, may be caused by the fact—as other sources state—that Hakim was not yet a member of the New York local Musicians Union, having moved from Chicago, and was told not to play by a local union representative. Hakim himself claims to have played piano on all tunes except "Now's the Time" and "Billie's Bounce". Reig claims that Hakim left before the final "Koko" take, due to the aforementioned local union rep.

"Ko-Ko" is probably the most controversial track on the album. Many sources state that Gillespie is the trumpet player on this track in place of Davis (including the liner notes of one of Davis' own albums: The Musings of Miles). Various reasons are given: the difficulty of the piece was too much for young Miles, his nerves got the better of him, or simply that he was not present at the time of recording. Other sources insist that it is indeed Miles on this track and attempt to prove it. Some sources additionally state that a) Gillespie played both trumpet and piano on this track  or that b) it is impossible for Gillespie to have played both trumpet and piano on this track. One source states that Hakim played piano on the introduction and the coda, allowing Gillespie to play during Parker's solo. It should be pointed out that there is no piano on the master track of Ko-Ko except during Parker's solo, so this is clearly erroneous, but the piano does begin at the beginning of Parker's solo making it unlikely that the trumpet player would have had time to switch instruments. On the aborted take 1 of Ko-Ko, however, the piano can be heard behind the "Cherokee" melody which both the trumpet and saxophone play. So on take 1, at least, Gillespie cannot have been playing both trumpet and piano. See the various resources for further discussions on this controversy.

In the end, this controversial date has been called "The Greatest Recording Made in Modern Jazz History." "Now's the Time" and "Thriving From a Riff" (also released as "Thriving on a Riff", later known as "Anthropology") are jazz classics. Davis, Gillespie and Roach are revered as jazz giants in their own right.

Track list

Personnel

As noted above, the precise personnel of this album remains unknown. For completeness, we list the personnel as presented on the label of the album—which is almost certainly incorrect in that it credits Bud Powell on piano—as well as the personnel as listed on Charlie Parker: The Complete Savoy Studio Sessions (the only other complete chronicle of this session), which also may be incorrect.

Personnel as listed on The Charlie Parker Story
 Charlie Parker – alto saxophone
 Miles Davis – trumpet
 Dizzy Gillespie – piano and trumpet
 Bud Powell – piano
 Max Roach – drums
 Curley Russell – double bass

Personnel as listed on Charlie Parker: The Complete Savoy Studio Sessions
 Miles Davis – trumpet
 Charlie Parker – alto saxophone
 Dizzy Gillespie – trumpet ("Koko" only), piano
 Sadik Hakim – piano ("Thriving on a Riff" and "Koko" only)
 Curly Russell – double bass
 Max Roach – drums

Notes

References

1956 albums
Charlie Parker albums
Savoy Records albums
Albums produced by Teddy Reig